Arpine Pehlivanian (Armenian: Արփինե Փեհլիվանյան, ; 24 April 1934 – 16 March 2004)  was a Lebanese Armenian classical coloratura soprano singer who fled Lebanon during the Lebanese Civil War and resettled in the United States, where she lived in Long Beach.

Early life and education
Pehlivanian graduated summa cum laude from the Lebanese National Conservatory of Piano and studied voice at the Chigiana Academy in Siena, where she earned Diplomas di Merito in Opera Interpretation, Vocal Chamber Music, and Opera Direction. She studied voice with Alvarez Boulos and Antonia Perazzi, among others.

Career
She was an official soloist with the Lebanese National Symphony Orchestra for 18 years and was also Professor of Voice and Piano and Director of Opera Interpretation Studies at the Lebanese National Conservatory of Music.

After leaving Lebanon for the United States during the Lebanese Civil War, she performed for the first time in Carnegie Hall in 1974. She was the first singer from the Armenian diaspora to perform at the Yerevan Opera Theatre. In addition to operatic performances, she gave more than 800 recitals worldwide, performing works by Vivaldi, Haydn, Tigranian, Rachmaninov, Scarlatti, Mozart and others. She premiered works by many Armenian and Middle Eastern composers, including Khachaturian's Agh Tamar, which she premiered in the United States, the United Kingdom, and the Middle East.

Pehlivanian was a member of the faculty at California State University in Long Beach.

Honors
Cilician Great Cross with the rank of Knight
Lebanese National Said-Akl Cultural Award
Gold Medal of the Syrian Educational Ministry
Bronze Halo Award of the Southern California Motion Picture Council (1983)
Music Teacher's Association of California Service Award (1987)

Personal life
She was the mother of conductor George Pehlivanian. Her daughter, Elizabeth Pehlivanian, is a mezzo-soprano. The three have appeared in performances together with the USC Symphony and the Pacific Symphony.

Selected discography
The Artistry of Arpine Pehlivanian (1982) 
Armenian Sacred Music (1986) 
Armenian Romance Songs (1997)

References

Armenian operatic sopranos
Lebanese people of Armenian descent
20th-century Armenian women opera singers
People of the Lebanese Civil War
Lebanese emigrants to the United States
2004 deaths
1934 births
Conservatoire Libanais alumni
Academic staff of Conservatoire Libanais
Accademia Musicale Chigiana alumni